Roman Nikolayevich Yuzepchuk (born 24 July 1997) is a Belarusian association football player who plays for Torpedo Moscow in the Russian Premier League.

Club career
On 3 February 2023, Yuzepchuk signed with Torpedo Moscow in the Russian Premier League.

International career
He has made 3 appearances and scored 3 goals playing for the Belarus national under-19 football team at the 2016 UEFA European Under-19 Championship qualification. Yuzepchuk earned his first cap for the senior team on 26 February 2020, playing as a starter for 60 minutes in the 1:0 away win over Bulgaria in a friendly match.

International goals
Scores and results list Belarus' goal tally first.

Honours
Dinamo Brest
Belarusian Premier League champion: 2019
Belarusian Cup winner: 2017–18
Belarusian Super Cup winner: 2019, 2020

Shakhtyor Soligorsk
Belarusian Premier League champion: 2022

References

External links
 
 

Living people
1997 births
People from Mogilev
Sportspeople from Mogilev Region
Belarusian footballers
Association football forwards
Association football defenders
Belarus international footballers
FC Dinamo Minsk players
FC Bereza-2010 players
FC Dynamo Brest players
FC Rukh Brest players
FC Shakhtyor Soligorsk players
FC Torpedo Moscow players
Belarusian Premier League players
Belarusian First League players
Russian Premier League players
Belarusian expatriate footballers
Expatriate footballers in Russia
Belarusian expatriate sportspeople in Russia